Cramptonomyia is a genus of gnats in the family Pachyneuridae. There is one described species in Cramptonomyia, C. spenceri.

References

Further reading

 

Bibionomorpha genera
Articles created by Qbugbot